Batrachorhina niveoscutellata is a species of beetle in the family Cerambycidae. It was described by Stephan von Breuning in 1940.

Subspecies
 Batrachorhina niveoscutellata dilacerata Breuning,
 Batrachorhina niveoscutellata niveoscutellata Breuning, 1940

References

Batrachorhina
Beetles described in 1940